Blepharomastix semifuscalis is a moth in the family Crambidae. It was described by George Hampson in 1907. It is found in Ecuador.

References

Moths described in 1907
Blepharomastix